The New York Encounter is an annual three-day event held in New York City in January, usually on Martin Luther King's weekend. It is a cultural event organized by members of the Catholic movement Communion and Liberation; it is composed of conferences, exhibitions, and artistic performances. The first edition was held in January 2011. The event follows the consolidated experience gained in Italy from the annual week-long event held in Rimini (Italy), called the Meeting for friendship among peoples, which has become a major event in Italy and attracts intellectuals, scientists, politicians, and religious figures of very high-profile from all over the world. The NYE is free and is organized with the help of volunteers and many young adults from all over the United States and Canada.

List of past events

2011  14–17 January
2012  13–15 January
2013  18–20 January. “Experiencing freedom”
2017  13–15 January. "Reality Has Never Betrayed Me"
2019 15–17 February. "Something to Start From”

List of upcoming events 

 2020 14–16 February. "Crossing the Divide”

References

External links
Official website

Communion and Liberation
Festivals in New York City